Pratap Park is a new garden and open gym in Udaipur, Rajasthan, India. It is situated near the bank of Pichola Lake.

General
The park is situated on the southern bank of Lake Pichola, along with the Pichola Ring Road. It covers 1.377 acres of land and contains gardens with a variety of floral plantation, and parking space in and around the garden.

Features
The park features a -sized letter sculpture reading "I LOVE UDAIPUR", with a view  Lake Pichola and the City Palace in the background. The open gymnasium comprises mechanical structures and equipment that can be used by visitors free  charge. There is also an acupressure walking track, around 250 m in length, that runs around the outlines  the garden. The park is equipped with solar lights, Neem fertilizers, and recycled cement slurry tiles.

Access 
Pratap Park is situated in a rather remote area and has no direct public transport connection. Visitors can reach to this place only via private vehicle or hired taxi or rickshaw. It can be reached from two roads - via Mulla Talai, taking a diversion from the Eklavya colony; or via the Jungle Safari route which starts from Doodh Talai Lake, and leads to Pratap Park.

References

Gardens in Rajasthan
Tourist attractions in Udaipur
Parks in Udaipur